Siniša Kovačević (born May 11, 1978) is a Bosnian former professional basketball player. He currently serves as a team manager for Igokea of the Bosnian Championship and the Adriatic League.

Playing career
Kovačević played for Crvena zvezda and Budućnost of the FR Yugoslavia League, for Vojvodina Srbijagas of the Basketball League of Serbia and for Igokea, Bosna Royal and Borac Banja Luka of the Basketball Championship of Bosnia and Herzegovina.

International career 
Kovačević was a member of the FR Yugoslavia U-18 national basketball team that won the bronze medal at the 1996 FIBA Europe Under-18 Championship. Over seven tournament games, he averaged 8.4 points, 2.7 rebounds and 1.9 assists per game.

Kovačević was a member of the Bosnia and Herzegovina national basketball team and competed at three EuroBasket tournaments (2001 in Turkey, 2003 in Sweden, 2005 in Serbia and Montenegro).

Post–playing career 
In May 2016, Kovačević was named a director for men's selections of the Bosnia and Herzegovina national basketball team. Also, he was a sports director of KK Student Banja Luka.

Career achievements
 Championship of Bosnia and Herzegovina champion: 1  (with Igokea: 2000–01)
 Basketball Cup of Bosnia and Herzegovina winner: 1  (with Bosna: 2004–05)

References

External links
 Player Profile at realgm.com
 Player Profile at eurobasket.com
 Profile at fibaeurope.com

1978 births
Living people
ABA League players
Basketball League of Serbia players
Bosnia and Herzegovina expatriate basketball people in Serbia
Bosnia and Herzegovina men's basketball players
KK Budućnost players
KK Crvena zvezda players
KK Igokea players
KK Vojvodina Srbijagas players
OKK Borac players
Serbian men's basketball players
Serbs of Bosnia and Herzegovina
Sportspeople from Banja Luka
Small forwards